The Sona Saila Maalai is a collection of one hundred stanzas (Venpaas) in Tamil written by the 17th-century poet and philosopher Siva Prakasar.

The poems
The hundred poems  were compiled to illustrate various patterns of Thamizh grammar. Each poem of Sona saila maalai  is generally named after its first few words.

Poet
Siva Prakasar, a Tamil philosopher, sage, and poet, lived at the end of 17th century.

References

Tamil-language literature
Shaivism
Vaishnavism
Hindu texts
Hymns
Sangam literature
Tamil philosophy
17th-century books